Sangdevin (also Romanized as Sangdevīn) is a city in Katul Rural District, in the Central District of Aliabad County, Golestan Province, Iran. At the 2006 census, its population was 3,671, in 862 families.

References 

Populated places in Aliabad County
Cities in Golestan Province